Nine Guests for a Crime is a 1977 Italian giallo film directed by Ferdinando Baldi. It was also known as La morte viene del passato (Death Comes From the Past) in Spanish markets. An alternate Italian title was Un urlo nella notte (A Scream in the Night).

Plot 
Nine people vacationing on a lonely island are being stalked and murdered by an unknown killer.

Cast 
Arthur Kennedy as Ubaldo 
John Richardson as Lorenzo
Caroline Laurence as Giulia
Venantino Venantini as Valther
Dana Ghia as Elisabetta
Massimo Foschi as Michele
 Loretta Perischetti as Patrizia
 Flavia Fabiani as Carla
 Rita Silva as Greta

See also 
 List of Italian films of 1977

References

External links

1977 films
1970s crime thriller films
Giallo films
Films directed by Ferdinando Baldi
Films scored by Carlo Savina
1970s Italian-language films
English-language Italian films
1970s English-language films
1977 multilingual films
Italian multilingual films
1970s Italian films